The Cave of Treasures (Syriac: M'drāth Gazzē, Arabic: Maghārat al-Kunūz, Ge'ez: Baʿāta Mazāgebet, Tigrinya: መዝገብ ገዛ ) sometimes referred to simply as The Treasure, is an apocryphal and pseudoepigraphical work, that contains various narratives related to the Christian Bible. It was written in the Syriac language, approximately at the end of the 6th, or at the beginning of the 7th century. Its authorship was traditionally attributed to Ephrem of Edessa (d. 373), but modern scholarly analyses have shown that the true author was some other person, who also lived in northern Mesopotamia, but much later ( 600).

Origin
This text is attributed to Ephrem the Syrian, who was born at Nisibis soon after AD 306 and died in 373, but it is now generally believed that its current form is 6th century or newer.

The assertion that the Cave of Treasures was written in the 4th century was supported by the general contents of the work. These reproduce Ephrem's peculiar methods of exegesis and supply many examples of his methods in religious argument, with which we are familiar from his other writings. His pride in the antiquity of the Syriac language also appears in this work. That it was written in Mesopotamia by a Syrian, there is no doubt, and if Ephrem was not the original author, the author belonged to the school of Ephrem.

The oldest Christian work on the history of God's dealing with man from Adam to Christ is probably the anonymous Conflict of Adam and Eve with Satan, which, in its original form, is from the 5th or 6th century AD. The writer of the Cave of Treasures borrowed largely from the Conflict of Adam and Eve, or shared a common source with it.

History
The Cave of Treasures was introduced to the world by Giuseppe Simone Assemani, the author of the Catalogues of Oriental Manuscripts in the Vatican Library, which he printed in Bibliotheca Orientalis in four thick volumes folio. In Vol. ii. page 498 he describes a Syriac manuscript containing a series of apocryphal works, and among them is one the title of which he translates Spelunca Thesaurorum. He saw that the manuscript contained the history of 5,500 years, from the creation of Adam to the birth of Christ, and that it was based upon the Scriptures. He says that fables are found in it everywhere, especially concerning the antediluvian Patriarchs, and the genealogy of Christ and His Mother. He mentions that the Patriarch Eutychius also describes a cave of treasures in which gold, frankincense, and myrrh were laid up, and refers to the "portentosa feminarum nomina," women of Jesus' ancestry. No attempt was made to publish the Syriac text; in fact, little attention was paid to it until August Dillmann began to study the Conflict of Adam and Eve in connection with it, and then he showed in Ewald's Jahrbüchern (Bd. V. 1853) that the contents of whole sections of the Book of the Cave of Treasures in Syriac and the Conflict of Adam and Eve in Ethiopic were identical. And soon after this, Dillmann and others noticed that an Arabic manuscript in the Vatican (No. XXXIX; see Assemânî, Bibl. Orient. i. page 281) contained a version of the Cave of Treasures, which had clearly been made from the Syriac. In 1883, Carl Bezold published a translation of the Syriac text of the "Cave of Treasures" made from three manuscripts (Die Schatzhöhle, Leipzig, 1883), and five years later published the Syriac text of it, accompanied by the text of the Arabic version.

Some passages from the Cave of Treasures are also found in the Coptic Enconium of Mary Magdalene of Pseudo-Cyril.

Of the subsequent history of the Syriac Cave of Treasures, little is known. The knowledge of parts of it made its way into Armenia soon after the book was written, and more than one translation of it was made into Arabic, probably in the 7th and 8th centuries. In connection with the Arabic translations, they all end with the account of the cruelties perpetrated by Archelaus and Sâlûm after the death of Herod. (See Bezold's text, page 247.) The last paragraph of the Arabic text mentions the twelve Apostles who went about with Christ, and refers to his baptism by John the Baptist, and says that he lived on the earth thirty-three years, and then ascended into heaven. Thus, for the last twenty-six pages of the Syriac text, there is no equivalent in the Arabic version. The same is substantially true for the Ethiopic Conflict of Adam and Eve. The section of the Syriac for which there is no rendering in Arabic or Ethiopic contains a series of statements addressed to the author's "brother Nemesius." It is possible, but unlikely, that these were added to the work by a later writer. As they do not deal with matters of genealogy, and deal almost exclusively with Jesus Christ's life and crucifixion, they probably failed to interest the Arab translator, and he left them untranslated, unless parts of the original Arabic translation have perished.  A version of the Cave of Treasures also made its way into the Arabic Apocalypse of Peter or Book of the Rolls.

That the Syriac Cave of Treasures was known and used by Solomon, Bishop of Perâth Maishân (Al-Basrah) in 1222 is proved by the earlier chapters of his work the Book of the Bee. He excerpted from it many of the legends of the early Patriarchs, although his object was not to write a table of genealogical succession, but a full history of the Christian Dispensation according to the views of the Nestorians. The best manuscript of the Cave of Treasures which we have to the Nestorians, in the British Library, Add MS 25875, was written by a Nestorian scribe in the Nestorian village of Alkôsh, and was bound up by him in a volume which included a copy of the Book of the Bee, whose author, Solomon, was the Nestorian Bishop of Al-Basrah early in the 13th century.

Contents
The author of the Cave of Treasures called his work "The Book of the order of the succession of Generations (or Families)," the Families being those of the Patriarchs and Kings of Israel and Judah; and his chief object was to show how Christ was descended from Adam. He did not accept the genealogical tables which were commonly in use among his unlearned fellow-Christians, because he was convinced that all the ancient tables of genealogies which the Jews had possessed were destroyed by fire by the captain of Nebuchadnezzar's army immediately after the capture of Jerusalem by the Babylonians. The Jews promptly constructed new tables of genealogies, which both Christians and Arabs regarded as fictitious. The Arabs were as deeply interested in the matter as the Christians, for they were descended from Abraham, and the genealogy of the descendants of Hagar and Ishmael was of the greatest importance in their sight, and it is due to their earnest desire to possess correct genealogical tables of their ancestors that we owe the Arabic translations of the Cave of Treasures. The Nubians and Egyptians were also interested in such matters, for the former were the legendary descendants of Kûsh, and the latter the descendants of Mizraim, and Ham was the great ancestor of both these nations.  It is clear that medieval Syrians, Arabs, Egyptians and Ethiopians regarded the Cave of Treasures as an authoritative work on their respective pedigrees.

In the title Cave of Treasures which was given to the "Book of the order of the succession of Generations" there is probably a double allusion, namely, to the Book as the storehouse of literary treasures, and to the legendarily famous cave in which Adam and Eve were made to dwell by God after their expulsion from Paradise, which was said to contain gold, and frankincense, and myrrh and was thus commonly called "The Cave of Treasures".

The Syriac Cave of Treasures tells us very little about the supposed physical attributes of the cave, said to be situated in the side of a mountain below Paradise, and nothing about Adam and Eve's way of life there. But in the "Book of Adam and Eve", the whole of the first main section is devoted to details of the physical cave.

References

Sources

External links
Translation of the Book of the Cave of Treasures

6th-century Christian texts

Christian mythology
Creation myths
Religious cosmologies
New Testament apocrypha
Texts in Syriac
New Testament apocrypha related with Adam and Eve